Bosera Asset Management Co., Limited. is a Chinese asset manager. As of 2020, Bosera is the eighth largest asset manager and third largest Fund Management Company by AUM in Mainland China after China Asset Management and E Fund Management. Bosera currently manages over US$200 billion. The company is headquartered in Shenzhen and has offices in Beijing, Zhengzhou, Shenyang, and Chengdu.

History 
Bosera was one of the first five fund management firms to be incorporated in Mainland China, founded in 1998.

Corporate affairs 
Bosera currently employs 598 employees.

Bosera's investment strategy is generally centered around fundamental analysis powered by their own internal research. The firm's clients include the National Social Security Fund of China.

Bosera Asset Management (International), a subsidiary of Bosera based in Hong Kong, is a RMB Qualified Foreign Institutional Investor and in 2014, partnered with KraneShares to list the first ETF in the United States incorporate to Chinese A-Shares, through Stock Connect.

In 2018 The Southern Bosera Fund Tower, a 42 floor Skyscraper designed by Austrian architect Hans Hollein, was completed and serves as their headquarters in Shenzhen, China.

References

External links 
Corporate website

Financial services companies of China
Financial services companies established in 1998
Investment management companies of China